Marco Girolamo Vida or Marcus Hieronymus Vida (1485? – September 27, 1566) was an Italian humanist, bishop and poet.

Life
Marco was born at Cremona, the son of the consular (patrician) Guglielmo Vida, and Leona Oscasale. He had two brothers: Giorgio, a captain in the service of Venice, and Girolamo, a canon of the cathedral chapter of Cremona. He also had three sisters: Lucia, Elena, and a third whose name is unknown.

He began his studies in Cremona, under the local grammarian, Nicolò Lucari. He was then sent to Mantua, and then Bologna and Padua. It is conjectured that it was in Mantua, where the Canons Regular had a school, that Marco took the habit, perhaps around 1505. By about 1510 he had been granted several benefices: in the diocese of Cremona at Ticengo, then at Monticelli (diocese of Parma), then at Solarolo Monestirolo, where he held the office of provost, and finally at Paderno, where he held the title of archpriest.

Vida joined the court of Pope Leo X and was given the Priory of San Silvestro at Frascati Pope Clement VII appointed him a Protonotary Apostolic. He became bishop of Alba on 7 February 1533. In 1544, however, the diocese and the entire marquisate of Monseratto were occupied by the French, in their long war with the Spanish, and the Bishop was forced to retreat to his benefices in Cremona. Bishop Vida attended the Council of Trent in May and June 1546, and again in March 1547. In 1549 and 1550 he became involved in a controversy between his native Cremona and the city of Pavia, helping to prepare the brief for his fellow citizens to be argued before the Spanish governor of Milan, Ferrante Gonzaga. The written defense was published as the Cremonensium Orationes III of clear Ciceronian influence.

On 29 March 1564 Bishop Vida wrote his last will and testament. He died on 27 September 1566.

Works

Vida wrote a considerable amount of Latin poetry, both secular and sacred, in classical style, particular the style of Virgil. Among his best-known works are the didactic poem in three books, De arte poetica (On the Art of Poetry), partly inspired by Horace, and Scacchia Ludus ("The Game of Chess"), translated into many languages over the centuries. 
Both poems were first published in 1527.

His major work was the Latin epic poem Christiados libri sex ("The Christiad in Six Books"), in the style and much of the language of Virgil. 
He began work on it under Pope Leo X, who was elected in 1513, but did not complete it until the early 1530s. 
It was published in 1535, well after the pope's death on 1 December 1521.

Editions 

 
 
 
 
 
 
 
 
 
 
 
 
 
 |

Notes

Bibliography
For a biography, background, comments on the main poems, and full study of the Christiad, see M. Di Cesare, Vida's Christiad and Vergilian Epic, New York: Columbia University Press, 1964. 
For a detailed bibliography of editions and translations of all his works, see M. Di Cesare, Bibliotheca Vidiana, Florence: Sansoni, 1974.)
A translation of his De arte poetica by Christopher Pitt can be found in the 19th volume of the collection English Poets edited by Alexander Chalmers.
 Gardner, James (trans.), Marco Girolamo Vida. Christiad (Cambridge, Mass.: Harvard University Press, 2009) (The I Tatti Renaissance library, 39).
 
 
 Marcus Hieronymus Vida, Poeticorum libri tres, edited by Agnieszka Paulina Lew, serie XV, vol. 99, Klassische Sprachen und Literaturen, Peter Lang Verlag, Frankfurt am Main 2011, 
 Marci Herionymi Vidae...Christiados Libri Sex (in Latin). Antwerp: Johan Steelsius, 1536.

Attribution

External links

 The Silkworm: original Latin and a Translation by Samuel Pullein
 

1480s births
1566 deaths
Clergy from Cremona
Christian poets
Epic poets
Italian poets
Italian male poets
Bishops in Piedmont
Italian Renaissance humanists
16th-century Italian Roman Catholic bishops
16th-century Italian writers
New Latin-language poets
Catholic poets
Writers from Cremona
Poet priests